María Aline Griffith (y) Dexter, Countess of Romanones  (22 May 1923 – 11 December 2017) was an American-born Spanish aristocrat, socialite, and writer who worked in the US Office of Strategic Services (OSS) during World War II and later for the CIA as a spy. She was a member of the International Best Dressed List since 1962. The spouse of a Grandee of Spain, she was a close friend to world leaders and celebrities including Nancy Reagan, Jacqueline Kennedy, and Audrey Hepburn.

Biography
Aline Griffith was born on 22 May 1923 in Pearl River, New York, into a family of six children. Her father was William Griffith, an insurance and real estate salesman, and her mother was Marie Griffith (née Dexter).

After graduating from the College of Mount Saint Vincent with a degree in literature, history, and journalism, Miss Griffith was hired as a model in Manhattan by Hattie Carnegie. She was working as a model when she was recruited by the OSS and sent to Spain, where she later met and married her husband. According to Elizabeth McIntosh's book, Sisterhood of Spies, Griffith "started out in Madrid in the X-2 code room in 1943, on call night and day to encipher messages. She also handled a small agent net that spied on the private secretary of a minister in the Spanish government. Most of her exciting work was done after hours when she developed an extensive social life, reporting on the gossip she had overheard after a night of partying, often with Spanish aristocracy."

Marriage
She married, in 1947, Luis Figueroa y Pérez de Guzmán el Bueno (1918–1987), Count of Quintanilla, a grandson of Álvaro de Figueroa, who was several times Prime Minister of Spain. They had three children: 
 Don Álvaro de Figueroa y Griffith, 10th Count of Quintanilla, 4th Count of Romanones (born 21 February 1949), married Lucila Domecq Williams.
 Don Luis de Figueroa y Griffith, 11th Count of Quintanilla, (born 5 February 1950), married princess Theresia zu Sayn-Wittgenstein-Sayn, and later, to María Inés Bárbara Márquez y Osorio
 Don Miguel de Figueroa y Griffith, married Magdalena Carral Cuevas, and later, Cristina Moratiel Llarena.

The couple later became the Count and Countess of Romanones upon the death of her husband's grandfather, Álvaro de Figueroa.

Socialite
She lived in her homes in Madrid, New York and her country estate, Pascualete, in the Spanish rural province of Caceres, the latter of which belonged to her husband's family and which she painstakingly restored. She was known for her lavish house parties, attended by many world leaders and celebrities, including Ronald and Nancy Reagan, Donald Trump, Jacqueline Kennedy, the Duchess of Alba, the Duchess of Windsor, Baron Guy de Rothschild, Salvador Dalí, Ava Gardner, Audrey Hepburn, and Grace Kelly, among many others.

In 2009, she was interviewed for the documentary film Garbo: The Spy about Juan Pujol, a Spanish double agent who supported Britain during World War II.

She owned a large collection of precious jewels, which she auctioned off towards the end of her life.

The Countess was also known for her imperious personality and quick temper. In June 2017 the New Yorker magazine published "The Countess's Private Secretary" by Jennifer Egan, which was an identifiable portrait of the countess.

Publications
Romanones published seven books; six are presented as non-fiction and one is a novel. The three Spy books all dealt with her involvement in espionage and intelligence.
 The Earth Rests Lightly (1964) which tells the story of her renovation of Pascualete, a work in progress.
 An American in Spain (1980)
 The Spy Wore Red (1988) 
 The Spy Went Dancing (1991) 
 The Spy Wore Silk (1991) 
 The Well-Mannered Assassin (1994), her first novel, based in part on Carlos The Jackal. 
 El fin de una era (2010), published in Spain.

Controversy
There is some controversy over the accuracy of Romanones' depiction of her work for OSS and the CIA in her memoirs. There is no doubt that she served as a cipher clerk for the OSS in Madrid during World War II, but historian Rupert Allason, writing under the pen name "Nigel West", contends that her "supposedly factual accounts [of her espionage work] were completely fictional." In 1991, Women's Wear Daily reported that it had retrieved her OSS file from the National Archives and found that Romanones had "embroidered her exploits as an American spy". According to the paper, she started out as a code clerk and then moved into a low-level intelligence job that involved reporting on gossip circulating in Spanish high society; there was no mention of her shooting a man or assisting in the exposure of a double agent, as her first book, The Spy Wore Red, alleges. Romanones responded to the allegations in a March 1991 Los Angeles Times interview: "My stories are all based on truth. It's impossible that whatever details of any mission I did would be in a file." Women's Wear Daily had also quoted an anonymous former intelligence officer's complaint that Romanones' later memoir gives the misleading impression that she and the Duchess of Windsor alone found a CIA mole when "it took the whole CIA two years and about 200 people to do it." Romanones replied "I did not pretend to do it single-handedly. I explained clearly that they only came to us when they couldn't find him." The CIA has declined comment on Romanones.

References

Bibliography
 Elenco de Grandezas y Títulos Nobiliarios Españoles, Hidalguía Editions, 2008.

Further reading 
 

 Inspiration for the character Valentina Allegra de Fontaine.

External links

1923 births
2017 deaths
American emigrants to Spain
Spanish countesses
Spanish spies
Grandees of Spain
People from Pearl River, New York
People of the Office of Strategic Services
Writers from New York (state)
College of Mount Saint Vincent alumni
Women spies